Kevin Burwell (born 25 January 1989) is an American professional basketball player who plays for KB Peja of the Kosovo Basketball Superleague. He played most recently for the New Jersey Thunder (APBL) in the U.S. He helped them to win the league title. He was voted to the USBasket.com All-APBL First Team.

Personal
Burwell was born and raised in Philadelphia, Pennsylvania, in Germantown. He is the son of Kevin Burwell, Sr., and Renee Tarpley. Throughout his childhood, Burwell participated in a variety of sports each season, playing basketball on a team for the first time at age six. Burwell graduated from Imhotep Charter School in 2006 playing both basketball and football. Burwell then attended Mississippi Valley State University, becoming one of the top point guards of the 2011–2012 NCAA Division I season. In 2012, Burwell went undrafted in the 2012 NBA draft, making him an unrestricted free agent. As of 2015, Burwell plays for KB Peja, a professional basketball club in Kosovo.

His hobbies outside of basketball are shopping and fixing cars.

References

1989 births
Living people
Basketball players from Philadelphia
Maryland Eastern Shore Hawks men's basketball players
Mississippi Valley State Delta Devils basketball players
CB Girona players
American men's basketball players
Point guards